Luwan District (Shanghainese: lu1uae1 chiu1, pinyin: Lúwān Qū), formerly romanized as Lokawei, was a district located in central Shanghai until its merger with Huangpu District in June 2011.

Location 
Luwan district was located directly south of People's Square. The northern part of Luwan included one of the best sections of Huaihai Road, famous for its international fashion shops and high-class restaurants.

History 
Luwan was a part of the old French Concession area, one of the most prestigious sections of the city. It was famous for its boulevards. The plane trees lining the main streets were imported from France over 100 years ago. The district included the historical residences of Sun Yat-sen, Mao Zedong, Zhou Enlai, Agnes Smedley and Mei Lanfang, among others.
It was announced on June 8, 2011, that the proposed plan of merging Luwan and Huangpu districts had been approved by the State Council. Since the new district would still maintain the name Huangpu, Luwan as a district ceased to exist.

Name origin 
The district was named after "Lujia Wan", formerly a bend in a local river which had since been covered up. The name survived in bus stops located near the former location of the bay. Known as Lukawei during the French concession period, this was the location of the main police depot and prison of the French Concession.

References

See also 
 Huangpu District, Shanghai
 Shanghai French Concession
 Xuhui District
 Lupu Bridge
 Lippo Plaza, Shanghai

Districts of Shanghai